Packages Mall is a shopping mall located in Lahore, Pakistan. It is among the largest malls in Pakistan.
It is located at Walton Road.
It is owned by Packages Limited.

See also
List of shopping malls in Pakistan

References

2017 establishments in Pakistan
Shopping malls established in 2017
Shopping malls in Lahore
Retailing in Lahore
Shopping malls in Pakistan